The 1883 Gallaudet Bison football team represented the Gallaudet University, a college for deaf-mutes, during the 1883 college football season. In the team's inaugural season, it defeated Georgetown twice. The players sewed their own uniforms, made of heavy canvas with black and white stripes.

Schedule

See also
 List of the first college football game in each US state

References

Gallaudet
Gallaudet Bison football seasons
College football undefeated seasons
Gallaudet Bison football